The knockout stages of the 2014 Copa do Brasil were played from August 27 to November 26, 2014. A total of 16 teams competed in the knockout stages.

A draw by CBF was held on August 18 to set the matches for this round. The 16 qualified teams were divided in two pots. Teams from pot 1 are the ones who competed at the 2014 Copa Libertadores plus the two highest CBF ranked teams qualified via the Third Round. Pot 2 is composed of the other teams that qualified through the Third Round. Each pot was divided into 4 pairs according to the CBF ranking. That division makes sure that each team within a pair will not face each other before the finals as they will be placed in opposite sides of the bracket. There was a draw to decide the home team of the round of 16. The following stages will have other draws to determine the order of the matches as the tournament advances.

Seeding

Bracket

Round of 16
The first legs will be played on August 27–28 and the second legs will be played on September 3–4, 2014.

|}

Match 71

Santos advanced directly due to Grêmio's disqualification.

Match 72

Tied 5–5 on aggregate, Botafogo won on away goals.

Match 73

Cruzeiro won 7–1 on aggregate.

Match 74

ABC won 3–2 on aggregate.

Match 75

Tied 3–3 on aggregate, Flamengo won 3–2 on penalties.

Match 76

América won 3–2 on aggregate.

Match 77

Atlético Mineiro won 3–0 on aggregate.

Match 78

Corinthians won 3–2 on aggregate.

Quarterfinals

|}

Match 79

Santos won 8–2 on aggregate.

Match 80

Tied 3–3 on aggregate, Cruzeiro won on away goals.

Match 81

Flamengo won 2–0 on aggregate.

Match 82

Atlético Mineiro won 4–3 on aggregate.

Semifinals

|}

Match 83

Cruzeiro won 4–3 on aggregate.

Match 84

Atlético Mineiro won 4–3 on aggregate.

Finals

|}

Atlético Mineiro won 3–0 on aggregate.

Notes

References

knockout